Stakčínska Roztoka is a village and municipality in Snina District in the Prešov Region of north-eastern Slovakia.

History
In historical records the village was first mentioned in 1574.

Geography
The municipality lies at an altitude of 370 metres and covers an area of 15.154 km2. According to the 2013 census it had a population of 333 inhabitants.

References

External links
 
 
http://www.statistics.sk/mosmis/eng/run.html

Villages and municipalities in Snina District